The Kandyan Convention (Sinhala: උඩරට ගිවිසුම Udarata Giwisuma) was a treaty signed on 2 March 1815 between the British Governor of Ceylon Sir Robert Brownrigg and the chiefs of the Kandyan Kingdom, British Ceylon (now Sri Lanka) for the deposition of King Sri Vikrama Rajasinha and ceding of the kingdom's territory to the British Crown. It was signed in the Magul Maduwa (Royal Audience Hall) of the Royal Palace of Kandy.

Background 
The king, of South Indian ancestry, faced powerful opposition from the Sinhalese chieftains who sought to limit his power. A successful coup was organized by the chieftains, marking the end of 2358 years of self-rule on the island and resulting in the imprisonment of the king in Vellore. The treaty is quite unique in that it was not signed by the monarch on the throne but by members of his court and other dignitaries of the kingdom.

The convention gained a degree of infamy when, according to apocryphal sources, Ven. Wariyapola Sri Sumangala Thero, a Buddhist monk of the kingdom, seized and trampled a Union Jack hoisted by the British, demanding the flag of Kandy be left flying until the Convention was signed.

The authenticity of the native signatures have recently been called into question.

Treaty content 
The proclamation consisted of 12 clauses.

'Sri Wickrema Rajasinha', the 'Telugu' king, is to forfeit all claims to the throne of Kandy.
The king is declared fallen and deposed and the hereditary claim of his dynasty, abolished and extinguished.
All his male relatives are banished from the island.
The dominion is vested in the sovereign of the British Empire, to be exercised through colonial governors, except in the case of the Adikarams, Disavas, Mohottalas, Korales, Vidanes and other subordinate officers reserving the rights, privileges and powers within their respective ranks.
The religion of Buddhism is declared inviolable and its rights to be maintained and protected.
All forms of physical torture and mutilations are abolished.
The governor alone can sentence a person to death and all capital punishments to take place in the presence of accredited agents of the government.
All civil and criminal justice over Kandyan to be administered according to the established norms and customs of the country, the government reserving to itself the rights of interposition when and where necessary.
Other non-Kandyan's position [is] to remain [as privileged as previously] according to British law.
The proclamation annexing the Three and Four Korales and Sabaragamuwa is repealed.
The dues and revenues to be collected for the King of the United Kingdom as well as for the maintenance of internal establishments in the island.
The governor alone can facilitate trade and commerce.

Signatories

 Sir Robert Brownrigg -  Governor of Ceylon
 Molligoda (the elder) - 1st Adigar and Dissawa of the Sath Korles
 Pilima Talawuwe (the elder) - 2nd Adigar and Dissawa of Sabaragamuwa
 Pilima Talawuwe (the younger) - Dissawa of Hathra Korles
 Monarawila - Dissawa of Uva
 Ratwatte - Dissawa of Matale
 Molligoda (the younger) - Dissawa of Thun Korles
 Dullewe - Dissawa of Walapane
 Millewe - Dissawa of Wellassa and Binthenna
 Galagama - Dissawa of Tamankaduwa
 Galagoda - Dissawa of Nuwara Kalawiya

Witnesses
 John D'Oyly - Chief Translator to the Government
 J.A.S. Surtherland - Deputy Secretary to the Government

The document
The Archives of the Government of Sri Lanka possesses the original copy of the Convention.

See also
 Kandyan Treaty of 1638
 Kandyan Wars

References

External links
 British Ceylon and Kingdom of Kandy 1805 (map)
 The Kandyan Convention and British policy
 1815: Kandyan convention and the role of D’Oyly
 Short History of Ceylon By Humphrey William Codrington
 Sri Lankan Ethnic Crisis: Towards a Resolution By R. B. Herath
 The 1815 Kandyan Convention at the Audience Hall
 The signing of the Kandyan Convention
 Kandyan Convention of 1815
 Kandyan Convention of 1815 by Dr. K.D.G. Wimalaratne

Kandyan period
K
Treaties of the Kingdom of Kandy
1815 treaties
History of Kandy